North Chicago is a city in Lake County, Illinois, United States, and a suburb of the Chicago metropolitan area. The population was 30,759 at the 2020 census making it the 2nd largest city by population in the county, after Waukegan.

North Chicago is home to the Great Lakes Naval Training Center and Great Lakes Barracks Military housing.

The city is also home to Rosalind Franklin University of Medicine and Science, which houses the Chicago Medical School, the Dr. William M. Scholl College of Podiatric Medicine, the College of Pharmacy, the College of Health Professions, and the School of Graduate and Postdoctoral Studies. North Chicago in the past was an important center of industry, and that past is reflected within the landscape as the area is still heavily industrialized  today.

Geography

The city is situated on Lake Michigan, immediately to the south of Waukegan. Most of its territory drains directly to the lake, but the western region drains to the North Branch of the Chicago River, and ultimately, since the engineering projects of the 19th century, to the Illinois and thence to the Mississippi River and the Gulf of Mexico.

North Chicago includes a Lake County Forest Preserve unit, the Greenbelt Cultural Center and Forest Preserve.

Major streets
  Tri-State Tollway
  Skokie Highway
  Waukegan Road
  Green Bay Road
  Sheridan Road
 Buckley Road
 Casimer Pulaski Road
 Argonne Drive
 14th Street
 Jackson Street
 Lewis Avenue
 Martin Luther King Junior Drive (formerly 22nd Street)

History

Land speculators moved into the area south of what is now the city of Waukegan in the 1890s. Industrial development began almost immediately with a railroad depot being set up in 1892; most notable was the arrival of the Washburn and Moen Manufacturing Company, a major barbed wire maker.

The settlement was incorporated as a village in 1895 and as a city in 1909. In 1911, a naval training area was created, the present Great Lakes Naval Training Center, currently the only "boot camp" for Navy enlisted personnel after the closure of facilities in Florida, California, and Houston, MS.

A Veteran's Administration hospital went into service in 1926. This facility was also threatened with closure in recent years, but has been retained on condition of merger with the Naval Hospital.

Historically, North Chicago was known for large populations of Eastern European immigrants. With the onset of the "Great Migration", large numbers of African Americans arrived in the city from states such as Arkansas and Alabama, and toward the end of the 20th century, became the best known demographic group. Housing was segregated in the mid 20th century, and until as late as 1957 the African-American section of town lacked sewers and paved roads. Latterly, Latinos have arrived in significant numbers, particularly from Mexico, and now form a notable group in the city, just as they do in Waukegan to the north. It is possible that North Chicago has over time been the most diverse and multicultural municipality in Lake County.

At one time, Navy personnel were a major part of the scene in North Chicago, both the "swabbies" (enlisted men) and the officers. Now, with the degeneration of "the Strip", or entertainment district along several blocks of Sheridan Road, sailors are rarely seen north of the railroad trestle. In the fall of 2007, the city finished demolishing the buildings on Sheridan Road between Martin Luther King Drive and the railroad trestle to the north, within the framework of a new development project involving tax increment financing.

A number of movies have been filmed on the Illinois Route 137 highway through North Chicago including Groundhog Day.

Notable people 
 Tiffany Brooks, HGTV television personality, winner Design Star, Season 8, attended North Chicago Community High School
 John S. Matijevich, Illinois state representative, was born in North Chicago
 Quincy Miller, college basketball player
 O'Brien Schofield, football Wisconsin Badgers, NFL player
 Tyrone Smith, Olympic long jumper, attended North Chicago Community High School
 Michael Turner, American Football, San Diego Chargers, Atlanta Falcons, attended North Chicago Community High School

Demographics

2020 census

Note: the US Census treats Hispanic/Latino as an ethnic category. This table excludes Latinos from the racial categories and assigns them to a separate category. Hispanics/Latinos can be of any race.

2010 Census
As of the 2010 United States Census, there were 32,574 people living in the city. The racial makeup of the city was 47.89% White (36.3% Non-Hispanic White), 29.92% Black or African American, 3.76% Asian, 0.71% Native American, 0.13% Pacific Islander, 13.30% of some other race and 4.29% of two or more races. 27.19% were Hispanic or Latino (of any race).

As of the census of 2000, there were 35,918 people, 7,661 households, and 5,577 families living in the city. The racial makeup of the city was 47.72% White, 36.26% African American, 0.84% Native American, 3.59% Asian, 0.15% Pacific Islander, 7.66% from other races, and 3.79% from two or more races. Hispanic or Latino of any race were 18.24% of the population.

There were 7,661 households, out of which 46.3% had children under the age of 18 living with them, 48.5% were married couples living together, 18.9% had a female householder with no husband present, and 27.2% were non-families. 21.8% of all households were made up of individuals, and 6.0% had someone living alone who was 65 years of age or older. The average household size was 3.09 and the average family size was 3.64.

In the city, the population was spread out, with 24.1% under the age of 18, 34.7% from 18 to 24, 27.5% from 25 to 44, 9.2% from 45 to 64, and 4.6% who were 65 years of age or older. The median age was 22 years. For every 100 females, there were 156.3 males. For every 100 females age 18 and over, there were 176.3 males.

The median income for a household in the city was $38,180, and the median income for a family was $40,485. Males had a median income of $24,480 versus $23,736 for females. The per capita income for the city was $14,564. About 12.0% of families and 15.1% of the population were below the poverty line, including 18.3% of those under age 18 and 15.4% of those age 65 or over.

North Chicago census figures include the Great Lakes Naval Training Center.

Education
North Chicago Community Unit School District 187 operates public schools. North Chicago High School is the city's high school.

Sources
 North Chicago, by Charles M. Leeks and Mary L. Robinson, in: Local Community Fact Book : Chicago Metropolitan Area (1990). Chicago : The Chicago Fact Book Consortium, Dept of Sociology, University of Illinois at Chicago, c1995.
 North Chicago, IL, by Wallace Best, in: The Encyclopedia of Chicago. Chicago : University of Chicago Press, c2004.irac

References

External links
 City website
 

 
Chicago metropolitan area
Populated places established in 1892
Cities in Lake County, Illinois
Cities in Illinois
Illinois populated places on Lake Michigan
Majority-minority cities and towns in Lake County, Illinois